Valentines Park is a  park, south of Gants Hill, it is the largest green space in the London Borough of Redbridge. The park was originally the grounds of Valentines Mansion, a residence built in 1696. Valentines Park holds a Green Flag Award and was voted one of the ten best parks in Britain in 2019.

The park, including Valentines Mansion, is managed on behalf of Redbridge Council by Vision RCL, a registered charity.

History
Valentines Park was put together by various purchases and gifts of land, starting in 1898 and culminating in the 1920s.

Cranbrook Estate
In 1899 the Cranbrook Estate, which now makes up an area in the west of the park, was about to be sold for housing. The Municipal Borough of Ilford had acquired its first section of parkland a year previously and was keen to enlarge its size as soon as land became available. Local officials believed that, unless an area of "relaxation and pleasure" was retained for the growing urban population, all traces of a rural Ilford could be lost.  The park was opened in the same year under the name of Cranbrook Park.

Valentines Mansion

Valentines Mansion was built in 1696 for Lady Tillotson, the widow of John Tillotson, Archbishop of Canterbury. For twenty years until around 1780 it was the family home of Sir Charles Raymond who had considerable interests in the East India Company as a ship owner and later became a banker. The house remained a family house until Sarah Ingleby, its last inhabitant, died on 3 January 1906. Following the death of the mansion's owner the local council acquired the remainder of its grounds and expanded the park. It is now a Grade II listed building.

Cricket Grounds
County Cricket was first played at Valentines Park in Ilford in 1922 and a pavilion was completed a year later after a Mrs Ingleby, who owned 136 acres of land surrounding it, donated the venue to Ilford CC.  The first ever county match to be played on a Sunday was played there on 15 May 1966 between Essex and Somerset, with 6,000 spectators attending.

Features

During 2007–2008 Valentines Park underwent an extensive renovation financed by the Heritage Lottery Fund and by the owners, the Council of the London Borough of Redbridge. The survival of formal Rococo features in a suburban park have given the park great heritage value, the park itself is Grade II Listed with several constructions in the park also holding listed status such as the Gardeners Cottage (Grade II) and the railings and gates (Grade II*).

Valentines Mansion (Grade II*) is now open to visit as a historic house and is hired out as a wedding venue.

Some of the parks other features include:

Boating Lake
Bandstand
Children's Play Area
Cricket Grounds
Cycle routes
Dog Exercise Area
Fitness Equipment
Picnic Area
Tennis Court
Parkrun route
Public Toilets
Walled Garden

The park previously had a lido but this was demolished in 1995.

Ecology

Valentines Park has a number of mature trees (including tulip trees, Scots pine, horse chestnuts, limes, and cedars of Lebanon) large yuccas, and manicured beds of shrubs other plants. The park is popular with birdwatchers and the species that have been spotted there include Marsh Tits and Turtle Doves.
It is also home to the Valentines Park Field Maple, one of the Great Trees of London.

In popular culture
Valentines Park is one of parks claimed to be the subject of the Small Faces hit, Itchycoo Park. 

It was the filming location of season 2 of The Great British Bake Off.

References

National Heritage List for England

Parks and open spaces in the London Borough of Redbridge
Grade II listed buildings in the London Borough of Redbridge
Cricket grounds in Essex
Sports venues in Essex
Essex County Cricket Club
Sports venues completed in 1923
1898 establishments in England